Niazabad or Neyazabad or Niyaz Abad may refer to:

Niazabad, Golestan
Niazabad, Lorestan
Niazabad, Khvaf, Razavi Khorasan Province
Niazabad, Zaveh, Razavi Khorasan Province
Niazabad, Sistan and Baluchestan